Anwara Bahar Chowdhury (13 February 1919 – 27 October 1987) was a Bangladeshi social activist and writer.

Background and education
Chowdhury was admitted to Sakhawat Memorial Girls' High School, established by women rights activist Begum Rokeya. She passed matriculation in 1934. She completed her higher secondary school examination and BA degree from Bethune College of Kolkata. She passed Bachelor in Teaching from Scottish Church College in 1941.

Career
Chowdhury was a professor of Bengali literature at Lady Brabourne College of the University of Calcutta. She became Secretary of Anjuman-e-Khawatin-e-Islam, or the All Bengal Muslim Women's Association established by Begum Rokeya. She served as the Headmistress of Vidyamoyee Girls' High School, Kamrunnesa Girls' High School and Bangla Bazar Government Girls' High School.

In 1955, she became a Special Officer of Women's Education at the Education Directorate. She was one of the founders of Bulbul Academy of Fine Arts (BAFA), established in Dhaka in 1955. She established Habibullah Bahar College in 1969.

Choudhury wrote several books which include biographies, school textbooks and books for children. She published her collection of poems, "Amar Chetonar Rang".

Personal life

Chowdhury was married to politician Habibullah Bahar Chowdhury. She had 3 daughters – Selina Bahar Zaman, Nasreen Shams and Tazeen Chowdhury and one son - Iqbal Bahar Chowdhury. A documentary on Chowhdury's life was made by her son Iqbal.

References

1919 births
1987 deaths
Bangladeshi women's rights activists
Bangladeshi women writers
Bangladeshi writers
20th-century Bangladeshi poets
Bethune College alumni
Scottish Church College alumni
University of Calcutta alumni
Academic staff of the University of Calcutta
Bangladeshi women poets
20th-century women writers
Women school principals and headteachers
Indian emigrants to Pakistan
Pakistani writers